The Pearce Sisters is a 2007 short film created by Aardman Animations.

Production

Plot

Cast
 Len Gray
 Dan Williamson

Critical reception

Awards and nominations
This is a list of awards and nominations of The Pearce Sisters.

|-
| 2007
| Luis Cook (Tied with Juan Pablo Zaramella for Lapsus)
| ANIMA - Córdoba International Animation Festival Best Animation award for Animated Stories
| 
|-
| 2007
| Luis Cook 
| Annecy International Animated Film Festival Special Jury Award for Short Films
| 
|-
| 2007
| Luis Cook 
| Annecy International Animated Film Festival The Annecy Cristal award
| 
|-
| 2007
| Luis Cook 
| Europe Cartoon Forum Cartoon d'Or
| 
|-
| 2007
| Luis Cook 
| Cinanima Grand Prize
| 
|-
| 2007
| Luis Cook 
| Krok International Animated Films Festival Grand Prix
| 
|-
| 2007
| Luis Cook  
| Sitges - Catalan International Film Festival award for Best Animated Short Film
| 
|-
| 2007
| Luis Cook  
| Tallinn Black Nights Film Festival Animated Dreams Special Mention
| 
|-
| 2008
| Jo Allen and Luis Cook 
| BAFTA Film Award for Best Short Animation
| 
|-
| 2008
| Luis Cook 
| Clermont-Ferrand International Short Film Festival award for Best Animation
| 
|-
| 2008
| Luis Cook (Prix UIP Tampere)
| European Film Awards Best Short Film Award
| 
|-
| 2008
| Luis Cook  
| Tampere International Short Film Festival Prix UIP Tampere (European Short Film)
| 
|-
| 2008
| Luis Cook  
| Grand Prix at World Festival of Animated Film Animafest Zagreb
| 
|}

References

External links
 
 

British animated short films
Animated films without speech
2007 films
2000s English-language films
2000s British films